Tsing Yi Public Library is a public library on Tsing Yi Island, Hong Kong. It is classified as Major District / District Libraries under the system of Hong Kong Public Libraries. Before the library was established, Hong Kong Government provided the islanders with only mobile library service.

History
After the completion of phase IV of Cheung Hong Estate, Tsing Yi Public Library was established on the ground floor of Hong Shing House of the estate on 21 March 1986. Although the library was small, it had one children's library, one adult library and one reference library.

The population of Tsing Yi Island continued to grow rapidly in 1980s and 1990s towards 200,000 as new housing projects were completed in the new town. The Regional Council decided to build a new library which was suggested in new town planning in 1980s. On 31 January 2000, the library moved to the current location, Tsing Yi Municipal Services Building. The library is on a single floor and is more spacious than the old library. Computing facilities and a newspaper reading room was introduced to the library. As the Council was disbanded, the library is then managed by the Leisure and Cultural Services Department.

Facilities
 Adult Lending Library
 Children's Library
 Computer Information Centre
 Extension Activities Room
 Multimedia Library
 Newspapers and Periodicals Section
 Reference Section
 Students' Study Room

Mobile services
Although the library in the central location of the new town of Tsing Yi Island, it is too far from the remote part of the new town. There are mobile services provided for Cheung Ching Estate in its south, Cheung Fat Estate in its north and Cheung Wang Estate in its east.

It also lends some of her collections to other organisations on the island.

External links
 
 

Tsing Yi
Public libraries in Hong Kong
Library buildings completed in 2000
Libraries established in 1986
Libraries in Hong Kong